The Anglin J6 Karatoo is an Australian ultralight and light-sport aircraft that was designed by Jesse Anglin and introduced in 1982. Over the years the J6 Karatoo has been produced by several different manufacturers, including Amax Engineering of Donvale, Victoria, Skyway Aircraft and is currently built by Serenity Aviation of Australia. The aircraft is supplied as plans or as a kit for amateur construction.

Design and development
The aircraft features a strut-braced high-wing, a two-seats-in-side-by-side configuration enclosed cockpit with doors, fixed conventional landing gear and a single engine in tractor configuration.

The aircraft fuselage is made from welded 4130 steel tubing, with its wings usually made with a wooden structure, all covered in doped aircraft fabric. The wing is supported by V-struts and jury struts and is constructed with marine plywood ribs and a D-cell leading edge, although a metal wing was under development. Wing folding for ground transport or storage is optional. Floats for water operations are an option.

Engines used include the  Rotax 503 and the  Rotax 582 two-strokes as well as the  Rotax 912UL, the  Rotax 912ULS,  Jabiru 2200,  Subaru EA engine,  Continental C-90 and the  Continental O-200A four-stroke powerplants.

In 1988 the J6 design was adapted to the Canadian ultralight rules as the Norman Aviation J6 Karatoo and, in 1990, as the Buzzman L'il Buzzard.

Operational history
In August 2012 there were 14 J6 Karatoos registered in the United States with the Federal Aviation Administration in the Experimental - Amateur Built and light-sport categories.

Variants
J6A Karatoo
The earliest versions had a solid spruce main spar and later a spruce I beam spar.
J6B Australian Karatoo
Improved model developed by Anglin in conjunction with Max Peters.
J6C Australian Karatoo

Specifications (Serenity J6B Australian Karatoo)

References

External links
Official website
J6 Karatoo photos on Airliners.net

J6 Karatoo
1980s Australian ultralight aircraft
Homebuilt aircraft
Light-sport aircraft
Single-engined tractor aircraft